The 2022–23 James Madison Dukes men's basketball team represents James Madison University in the 2022–23 NCAA Division I men's basketball season. The Dukes, led by third-year head coach Mark Byington, play their home games at the Atlantic Union Bank Center in Harrisonburg, Virginia as members of the Sun Belt Conference. 

The season marks the Dukes' first season in the Sun Belt Conference as they had previously been members of the Colonial Athletic Association.

Previous season
During the 2021–22 season, the Dukes competed in the Colonial Athletic Association, of which they had been a member since the conference was founded in 1979. They completed the season at 15–14 overall and 6–12 in CAA play to finish in eighth place. 

On November 6, 2021, the school announced that it would leave the CAA to join the Sun Belt Conference effective June 30, 2022. In response to their announced move to the Sun Belt Conference, the Dukes were banned by the CAA from competing in the CAA Tournament.

Offseason

Departures

Incoming transfers

Recruiting

Recruiting class of 2023

Preseason

Preseason Sun Belt Conference poll 
In the conference's preseason coaches poll, the Dukes were picked to finish fourth, but were one of four schools to receive first place votes. Additionally, senior guard Vado Morse was named to the preseason All-Conference First Team.

Roster

Schedule and results

|-
!colspan=12 style=|Non-conference regular season

|-
!colspan=9 style=|Sun Belt Conference regular season

|-
!colspan=9 style=| Sun Belt Conference tournament

Source:

References

James Madison Dukes men's basketball seasons
James Madison Dukes
James Madison Dukes men's basketball
James Madison Dukes men's basketball